The 1992 World Mountain Running Championships was the 8th edition of the global mountain running competition, World Mountain Running Championships, organised by the World Mountain Running Association and was held in Val di Susa, Italy on 30 August 1992.

Results

Men
Distance 14.7 km, difference in height 1394 m (climb).

Men team

Men short distance

Men short distance team

Men junior

Men junior team

Women

Women team

Women junior
Junior women individual

Women junior team

References

External links
 World Mountain Running Association official web site

World Mountain Running Championships
World Long Distance Mountain Running